The 2015–16 Borussia Mönchengladbach season was the 116th season in the club's history.

Players

Squad
As of 23 August 2015

Transfers

In

Total Spending:  €37,000,000

Out

Total Incoming:  €14,500,000

Loan in

Loan out

Season overview

Competitions

Bundesliga

League table

Results summary

Results by round

Matches

DFB-Pokal

UEFA Champions League

Group stage

Statistics

Goalscorers
This includes all competitive matches.  The list is sorted by shirt number when total goals are equal.

Last updated: 14 May 2016

Disciplinary record

References

Borussia Mönchengladbach seasons
Borussia Monchengladbach
Borussia Monchengladbach